A Seaport at Sunset is a 1749 oil painting on canvas by Claude-Joseph Vernet. It depicts a sea port, and presumably a war scene. A lightouse is visible, at the center right, while several people are on land, and a number of ships on sea, engaged on combat, with cannons smoke visible, are at the left. It is held at the Timken Museum of Art, in San Diego.

References

1749 paintings
Paintings by Claude-Joseph Vernet
Paintings in the collection of the Timken Museum of Art
Landscape paintings